Serhiy Burkovsky is a Ukrainian retired footballer.

Career
Serhiy Burkovsky, started his career with Veres Rovno in 1997 and Torpedo Zaporizhzhia. In 1998 he moved to Volyn Lutsk until 2002, where he won the Ukrainian First League in the season 2001–02. He also played 12 matches with Kovel-Volyn Kovel 2. He also played 4 matches for LUKOR Kalush and in summer 2003 he moved to Desna Chernihiv the main club in the city of Chernihiv. Here he managed to play 12 matches and got second place in Ukrainian Second League in the season 2004–05.

Honours
Volyn Lutsk
 Ukrainian First League: 2001–02

Desna Chernihiv
 Ukrainian Second League: Runner-Up 2004–05

References

External links 

 Serhiy Burkovsky footballfacts.ru
 Serhiy Burkovsky allplayers.in.ua

1972 births
Living people
FC Desna Chernihiv players
FC Volyn Lutsk players
FC Torpedo Zaporizhzhia players
FC Kalush players
Ukrainian footballers
Ukrainian Premier League players
Ukrainian First League players
Ukrainian Second League players
Association football defenders